Magkaibang Mundo (International title: My Secret Love / ) is a 2016 Philippine television drama romance fantasy series broadcast by GMA Network. Directed by Mark Sicat dela Cruz, it stars Louise delos Reyes and Juancho Trivino. It premiered on May 23, 2016 on the network's Afternoon Prime line up replacing Wish I May. The series concluded on September 16, 2016 with a total of 84 episodes. It was replaced by Oh, My Mama! in its timeslot.

The series is streaming online on YouTube.

Premise
Princess comes from a prosperous and loving family. When her father dies during an accident, her family lost their wealth and Princess is left isolated by her relatives. She eventually meets an elf, Elfino where she finds comfort in him and their friendship starts.

Cast and characters

Lead cast
 Louise delos Reyes as Princess Santos Sandoval-Cruz
 Juancho Trivino as  Elfino / Ellias "Inoy" Cruz

Supporting cast
 Assunta De Rossi as Amanda "Felly" Santos-Sandoval
 Gina Alajar as Noreen Sandoval-Perez
 Rez Cortez as Jonathan "Jojo" Perez
 Maricar de Mesa as Criselda Dizon
 Ana Capri as Barang
 Isabelle de Leon as Sophia "Sofie" Sandoval Perez
 Mike "Pekto" Nacua as Bombi
 Liezel Lopez as Analyn Sandoval Perez
 Marika Sasaki as Maria Felicia "Maffy" Payongayong
 Balang as Dino

Guest cast
 Kim Belles as young Princess
 Jan Michael Patricio Andres as young Elfino
 Althea Ablan as young Sofie
 Dion Ignacio as Jeffrey Dizon
 Geraldine Villamil as Dahlia
 Frances Makil-Ignacio as Celia
 Jhoana Marie Tan as Bito
 Lucho Ayala as Ricky
 Gabby Eigenmann as Ruben Sandoval
 Jaime Fabregas as a judge
 Sheila Marie Rodriguez as Aileen
 Chrome Cosio as Serge
 Carme Sanchez as Marang
 Lui Manansala as Biring

Ratings
According to AGB Nielsen Philippines' Mega Manila household television ratings, the pilot episode of Magkaibang Mundo earned a 15.8% rating. While the final episode also scored a 15.8% rating.

References

External links
 
 

2016 Philippine television series debuts
2016 Philippine television series endings
Fantaserye and telefantasya
Filipino-language television shows
GMA Network drama series
Philippine romance television series
Television shows set in Quezon City